Abdalar (also Romanized as Ābdālār, Abdāllar, Abdāllār, and ‘Abd ol Lār; also known as ‘Abdowllār, Āb-i-Dālār, and Ebdāl Lar) is a village in Sohrevard Rural District, in the Central District of Khodabandeh County, Zanjan Province, Iran. At the 2006 census, its population was 181, in 36 families.

References 

Populated places in Khodabandeh County